The 15th Chunwon began on 15 June 2010 and concluded on 27 January 2011. Defending champion Park Junghwan progressed past the first round, but his title defense was halted after losing to Yun Junsang in the second round. Choi Cheol-han was the eventual winner, winning the Chunwon for the third time in his career.

Tournament

Finals

References 

2011 in go
Go competitions in South Korea